Rumi Pukyu (Quechua rumi  stone, pukyu spring, well, "stone spring (or well)", also spelled Rumipuquio)  is a mountain in the Andes of Peru which reaches a height of approximately . It lies in the Junín Region, Tarma Province, on the border of the districts of Acobamba and Huasahuasi. Rumi Pukyu lies on the left bank of the Pallqamayu, north of the village of Acobamba.

References 

Mountains of Peru
Mountains of Junín Region